Friedberger may refer to:

Places 
 Friedberger Ach, a small river in Bavaria, Germany
 Friedberger Baggersee, a lake in Swabia, Bavaria, Germany

People 
 Ernst Friedberger (1875–1932), Jewish German immunologist
 Eleanor Friedberger (born 1976), American musician
 Matthew Friedberger (born 1972), American musician

See also 
 Friedberg (disambiguation)
 Friedeberg (disambiguation)

German-language surnames
Jewish surnames